Milk tea is a beverage.

Milk tea may also refer to:

Milk Tea (singer) or Rene Liu (born 1970), Taiwanese singer-songwriter, actress, director, and writer
"Milk Tea" (Ua song), 1998
"Milk Tea"/"Utsukushiki Hana", a single by Masaharu Fukuyama, 2006
"Milk Tea", a song by Koda Kumi from Black Cherry, 2006
Milk Tea Alliance, online political movement

See also
Yubisaki Milk Tea, a manga by Tomochika Miyano